The 10th in the series of Richmal Crompton's books about the eleven year old William Brown and his three compatriots, together known as the Outlaws.
First published in 1929 the book is a collection of short stories featuring William and his unfailing belief in his own ingenuity and righteousness, Although combative, almost pugnacious, in his efforts to be free to experience excitement and adventure within the confines of a village community, William is unquestioning of the right of adults to exert authority and to exact retribution for those acts which he and the Outlaws had otherwise justified to themselves.

In these more enlightened times William and his gang would undoubtedly be the subject of attention by the police and social workers. His "crimes" include not only petty theft from his own family but also breaking and entering, theft, deception and continual acts of trespass.

Stories

The Mystery of Oaklands 
Heavily influenced by a series of mystery crime novellas, William and the Outlaws become convinced that a local resident has murdered his neighbor, Old Scraggy, as a prelude to theft and buried him by the rose bush in his front garden.

William impersonates the "deceased" Old Scraggy in an effort to disturb the murderer to the point where he confesses his crimes as in the "Myst'ry of the One Eyed-Man". The Outlaws break into Old Scraggy's house but are discovered by the returning occupant who has in fact only been away on holiday and are locked in an upstairs room. Such is the exaggeration of Old Scraggy's description of the burglars and would be assailants, that the local policeman is only amused to discover 4 local "nippers" who might have been involved in acts of trespass on a local farmers land. Old Scraggy is too embarrassed to pursue prosecution and the policeman even declines to "box their ears".

The New Game 
After William overhears his older brother and others discussing greyhound racing he, without much opposition, persuades the Outlaws to join him in organizing a greyhound race starring his own mongrel dog Jumble and another. After conceding that charging entry to the event will not work they decide that the way to easily profit from the enterprise is to run a book and to charge for refreshments. The only asset available to Outlaws is that of their own labour which they sell to obtain the funding for the comestibles which have to be purchased retail.

On the day of the race the boys steal a dog chained outside a neighbour's house and attempt to induce it to race Jumble in pursuit of a clockwork mouse. The event is something of a fiasco and the comestibles are stolen by a rival gang, the Hubert Laneites, while William and the Outlaws attempt to retrieve the now runaway dogs. The experience of trying to run a book is not a happy one for Douglas and he ends up taking to his heels pursued by angry punters.

In retribution William's father demands further unpaid labour, sawing logs, but William's ingenuity knows no bounds and he is able to score a psychological victory over Hubert Lane and his gang.

William's Double Life 
While the other Outlaws are away on holiday William occupies himself by trespassing in the gardens of a property called The Laburnams. Each day for a week William steals substantial quantities of fruit from The Laburnams' Orchard and a total of some 200 fish from the pond. After being caught in the act by Miss Murgatroyd, William fakes being his own better socially adapted brother, Algernon. For several days William's alter ego, Algernon, is able to dissuade Miss Murgatroid from reporting his felony to his father. When Miss Murgatroyd does finally visit his home to expose his crimes, such is the identity confusion that William's parents believe that she is deranged.

William's pleasure in his amoral activities and the successful theft of 200 fish is sufficient that he faces the unspecified denouement with complete insouciance.

William and the Waxwork Prince 
When William is "kept in" at school by the headmaster, Old Markie, on the day of the local fair, the Outlaws steal a waxwork figure from one of the tents which is substituted for William. William, carried away by their success, then attempts to impersonate a waxwork at the fair. The attempt appears to go badly. Ultimately the stolen waxwork is returned undamaged and the waxwork proprietor puts profit before principle.

The headmaster's use of corporal punishment is accepted without question by William but the author demonstrates a finer love of natural justice by paying back Old Markie with "one of the worst attacks of arthritis in his right arm (that) he'd had for a long time".

William the Showman 
William and the Outlaws decide to put on their own waxwork show. In the course of the preparations for the show, the Outlaws demonstrate the poverty of their education. The first show ends in a fight between the Outlaw's "waxworks" and a rival local gang, the Hubert Laneites. A second attempt leads William to break into the grounds of The Hall in order to steal flowers. Here he bumps into Rosemary Verney who is about to be interviewed, against her will, for a society magazine. The two switch places. The bogus waxwork show is a huge success but the interview is not. Rosemary is sent away to boarding school an outcome for which she is extremely grateful as she has no wish to continue to live with her self-obsessed mother.

The Outlaws Deliver the Goods 
William and the Outlaws demonstrate an admirable disdain for the accumulation of wealth but are completely subservient to the need for social status gained by charitable giving. In passing, the Outlaws demonstrate great prescience in advance of the contemporary attitude toward education, that is that it should be pursued solely for pecuniary advantage. While trying to raise charitable funds, with the objective of protecting their social status, the Outlaws turn once again to the retail opportunity afforded by a refreshment stall. The Outlaws efforts are in vain as they are they are misled by Hubert Lane and his gang who steal the Outlaws' stock.

The Hubert Lane plot leads to the Outlaws entering another neighbours house and being subjected to social snobbery and being mistaken for the recipients of charitable aid themselves.

Fortune ultimately favours the Outlaws when they receive a substantial reward which they unhesitatingly donate to the school fund in order to guarantee their social status.

Fireworks Strictly Prohibited 
William and the Outlaws reach new pinnacles of amorality as, faced with a parental ban on the purchase of fireworks, they dupe the sister of a retired Colonel Masters into assisting them in the theft of her brothers fireworks. Although the Outlaws do not get to benefit directly from the theft they find a transcendent reward in witnessing their parents brought low while hypocritically engaging in a spontaneous party with the fireworks, which they have in turn appropriated from the boys.

The Outlaws Fetch the Holly 
The Outlaws commit wilful trespass and William is mistaken for a visitor from space by a perhaps senile professor. William tries to avoid the trespass being exposed by conspiring with the professors illness. Concurrent with these events is the story of the boys' failure to carry through on a commitment to support the local church by collecting decorative holly.

The Sentimental Widow 
A story of adult male greed and emotional exploitation of generous hearted women. William demonstrates an instinctive attachment to a code of honour to repay favours unstintingly given and a remarkable presence of mind in exposing a cynical Lothario. William's reward is nothing more than a return to the status quo and the consumption of a "cookie boy"

William and the Prize Pig 
In part a tale of the exploitation of animals in which William and the Outlaws feed cinders and sawdust to an overweight pig that is confined and overfed in order to win prizes at shows. William successfully rides the beast and in so doing gives the pig its first experience of freedom and activity.

To avoid retribution by the farmer, the Outlaw's set out to expose him as a former criminal and break into his home to steal a teapot which, in fairness, they believe they are returning to its previous owner.

While carrying out a second burglary, William disturbs another, more serious burglar and locks him in an upstairs room (providing literary symmetry with the first tale in this collection).

William's emotionally detached father, who doesn't participate in his child's  life, other than to exert erratic and ineffectual behavioural correction, feels obliged to honour what he regards as an ill judged promise to take William to a pantomime in town when he would far rather be playing golf. William has also learned to be emotionally detached from his family and welcomes the event only for the purpose of receiving 5/- shillings from an aunt that they will visit on the same day. It is important to note that William and the Outlaws have a communist philosophy and hold all pocket money in common.

Short story collections by Richmal Crompton
Just William
Children's short story collections
1929 short story collections
1929 children's books
George Newnes Ltd books